Harriet Tubman Museum is a museum in Cape May, New Jersey, about Harriet Tubman.

It is in the Howell House, which used to be the Macedonia Baptist Church's parsonage facility. The facility was renovated to hold the museum.

It had a virtual opening coinciding with Juneteenth (June 17, 2020). It physically opened on Thursday September 17, 2020, with Governor Phil Murphy attending. Murphy had approved a bill designating this as the state's official Harriet Tubman Museum. The museum refers to Tubman's time living in Cape May.

The formal opening to the public was on Juneteenth in 2021.

See also
List of museums focused on African Americans

References

External links
 
 

Harriet Tubman
Cape May, New Jersey
Museums in Cape May County, New Jersey
2020 establishments in New Jersey
African-American museums in New Jersey